The Milwaukee Institute of Art & Design (MIAD) is a private art school in Milwaukee, Wisconsin. Founded in 1974, it offers the Bachelor of Fine Arts degree. MIAD is considered the successor to the Layton School of Art, and was formerly known as the Milwaukee School for the Arts.

History 
MIAD’s predecessor was the Layton School of Art. Layton was founded in 1920 by Charlotte R. Partridge and Miriam Frink. The two women worked together from 1920 until their retirement in 1954 to establish Layton as an accredited institution of higher education. The Layton School of Art attracted some of the finest faculty in the region and by 1954 the school was serving over 1000 students through both day and evening courses.

Upon closure of Layton, in 1974, seven faculty members co-founded the Milwaukee Institute of Art & Design. These included CW Peckenpaugh, Roland Poskaand, and Jack H. White.

Academics 
The institution offers only the Bachelor's of Fine Arts degree. It is accredited by the Higher Learning Commission and National Association of Schools of Art & Design.

Faculty 
MIAD's faculty consists of about 100 working artists, designers and scholars. With about 650 full-time students, the ratio of student to faculty is 15 to 1.

Enrollment 
630 Students (Includes full-time and part-time, degree-seeking students) 54% Female, 46% Male
600 Pre-College students
250 Outreach/Special Programs students

Campus 
MIAD's campus is located in Milwaukee's Historic Third Ward, one of the city's arts districts, bordered by the Milwaukee River and Lake Michigan.  MIAD occupies three historic buildings:

In 1992, after a complete renovation, the college moved into the Jane Bradley Pettit Building.

Galleries 
Brooks Stevens Gallery of Industrial Design (Jane Bradley Pettit Building)
Frederick Layton Gallery (Jane Bradley Pettit Building)
East Gallery (Jane Bradley Pettit Building)
Perspectives Gallery (Jane Bradley Pettit Building)

References

External links 
 Official website

Art schools in Wisconsin
Design schools in the United States
Universities and colleges in Milwaukee
Educational institutions established in 1974
Art museums and galleries in Wisconsin
Tourist attractions in Milwaukee
1974 in art
1974 establishments in Wisconsin
Private universities and colleges in Wisconsin